A chumra (pl.  ;) is a prohibition or obligation in Jewish practice that exceeds the bare requirements of Halakha (Jewish law). One who imposes a chumra on oneself in a given instance is said to be machmir. The rationale for a chumra comes from Deuteronomy 22:8, which states that when someone builds a house, he must build a fence around the roof in order to avoid guilt should someone fall off the roof. This has been interpreted by many as a requirement to "build a fence around the Torah" in order to protect the mitzvot.

An obligation or prohibition can be adopted by an individual or an entire community. Early references to chumrot are found in the Talmud, and the understanding and application of them has changed over time.

Most often found in Orthodox Judaism, chumrot are variously seen as a precaution against transgressing the Halakha or as a way of keeping those who have taken on the stringency separate from those who have not.

A second meaning of chumra is simply "a stricter interpretation of a Jewish law (Halakha), when two or more interpretations exist". This meaning is closely related to the first meaning, because people who follow the more lenient interpretation (qulla) believe that their interpretation is the baseline requirement of the law, and that people who observe the stringency are doing something "extra". However, people who observe the chumra, in this sense, believe that they are following the baseline requirement, and to do any less would be to violate halakha entirely. In many cases, a rule followed by the majority (or even totality) of halakha-observant Jews today is a stringency in comparison with more lenient rabbinic opinions which have existed in the past or even today. For example, universal halakhic practice today is to wait at least one hour (and even as much as six hours) after eating meat, before consuming milk. However, Rabbenu Tam, in 12th-century France, ruled that it was sufficient merely to conclude the meat meal by reciting a blessing and removing the tablecloth, and then milk could be consumed immediately. Thus, today's universal halakhic practice of waiting between meat and milk would be considered a chumra in comparison to Rabbenu Tam's ruling.

See also
 Frum
 Khumra (Islam)

References

Jewish law and rituals
Hebrew words and phrases in Jewish law